Eindhoven Strijp-S is a railway station located in northwestern Eindhoven, Netherlands at the Strijp-S creative and residential district built on the former Philips factory complex. The station was opened on 23 September 1971 and is located on the Breda–Eindhoven railway. The station is operated by Nederlandse Spoorwegen.

The station was known as Eindhoven Beukenlaan until 13 December 2015 when it was renamed Eindhoven Strijp-S. This is to reflect the redevelopment of the area around the station into a business park, called Strijp-S.

Before 2018 the station will have lifts installed to make the platforms accessible for persons of reduced mobility, buggies etc.

Train services
The station is served by the following service(s):

2x per hour local services (stoptrein) Tilburg Universiteit - Eindhoven
2x per hour local services (stoptrein) 's-Hertogenbosch - Eindhoven - Deurne

External links

NS website 
Dutch Public Transport journey planner

References

Beukenlaan
Railway stations opened in 1971
Railway stations on the Staatslijn E
1971 establishments in the Netherlands
Railway stations in the Netherlands opened in the 20th century